Margaret Lucas may refer to:
 Margaret Lucas (engineer)
 Margaret Bright Lucas, suffragist
Margaret Cavendish, Duchess of Newcastle-upon-Tyne, née Lucas, writer, scientist and aristocrat